Sons of Spartacus is Angelic Upstarts' tenth studio album, released in 2002. The album was recorded by Mensi with members of Red Alert, Red London and Leatherface.

Track listing
All lyrics composed by Thomas Mensforth and all music written by Tony Van Frater; except where indicated

Side A
"Safe Heaven"
"Lonely Man of Spandau II"
"Supergrass"
"Chuck Taylor (Ace of Hearts)"
"Caught in the Crossfire"
"Action Man" (Mensforth, Ray Cowie)
"Don't Get Old (In Tony's Britain)"
"South Shields Born 'N' Bred"

Side B
"Tally Ho Ginger"
"Maxwell Dynasty"
"Stop The City"
"The Great Divide"
"Bandiera Rossa" (Traditional; arranged by Thomas Mensforth and Tony Van Frater)
"Stand Up"
"Anti-Nazi"

Personnel
Thomas "Mensi" Mensforth - vocals
Tony Van Frater - guitar, backing vocals; lead vocals on "Chuck Taylor (Ace of Hearts)"
Gaz Stoker - bass
Andrew "Lainey" Laing - drums
Jammy Jones, Steve "Cast Iron" Smith - additional backing vocals
Technical
Fred Purser - engineer, keyboards on "Maxwell Dynasty"

References

2002 albums
Angelic Upstarts albums
Captain Oi! Records albums